Burgheard was a medieval Bishop of Lindsey (or perhaps Bishop of Lichfield).

Burgheard is known from one charter, which he witnessed as bishop in 869.  The charter does not identify of where he was bishop, so it is possible that Eadberht, who also signed the charter, may have been bishop of Lindsey and he of Lichfield rather than vice versa.
 
Burgheard was consecrated between 866 and 869 and died sometime after that.

Citations

References

External links
  (as Bishop of Lindsey)

Bishops of Lindsey